Kaimuki High School is a WASC-accredited four-year public high school located in Honolulu, Hawaii, United States. Kaimuki High School falls under the jurisdiction of the Hawaii Department of Education. It is bordered by the Manoa-Palolo Drainage Canal, Kapiolani Boulevard, Kaimuki Avenue, Crane Park and Date Street. It is, as its alma mater states, in view of Diamond Head. The campus boasts the sculpture Pueo (owl) by Charles W. Watson.

History
During World War II when schools were allowed to reopen, a McKinley Annex was started in Kaimuki Intermediate School for sophomores and juniors residing in that part of the city. These students went to school in the afternoon from 12:20 p.m. to 5:00 p.m. In September 1943, the McKinley Annex became Kaimuki High School. The student government was established along democratic lines. A constitution written cooperatively was adopted by the student body in 1944.

In 1947, plans for Kaimuki High School's new location were initiated and construction began.

By September 1950, a total of 45 standard sized classrooms, three shops, and a cafeteria were available for use. The administration building was occupied in October 1950. Kelly Green and Light Gold were adopted as the school colors in 1950. In 1951, 1952, and 1953, additional buildings to house business education, agriculture, science, art, homemaking, mechanical drawing, publications, and girls' and boys' physical education were completed. The public address system was installed in 1953.

In 1954, grandstands to accommodate 1,554 students were erected on the campus, since there was no auditorium. For safety reasons, these grandstands were dismantled in 1973.

The music building was completed during the summer of 1956. Playcourts for boys and girls were completed during the 1957-58 school year, and in 1961 the 50-meter Olympic swimming pool was completed. A new auto mechanics shop was completed in 1962. Two Quonset huts were also purchased and moved onto campus.

On April 10, 1964, Kaimuki High School dedicated its new gymnasium. In 1983, grade 9 was added to the student body. An auditorium to accommodate 600 students was also built. The performing arts learning center was established in 1987.

Currently Kaimuki High School is one of the six public schools in the Honolulu District.

Student enrollment is approximately 850 students.

It is a comprehensive four-year, co-educational high school accredited by the Western Association of Secondary Schools and Colleges.

Kaimuki draws its students from the feeder schools of Jarrett Middle and Washington Middle.

Complex Area Information
Kaimuki High School is part of the Hawaii Department of Education Kaimuki-McKinley-Roosevelt Complex Area along with McKinley High School and Roosevelt High School.

Kaimuki Complex
The Kaimuki Complex consists of 9 elementary and middle schools in addition to Kaimuki High School.

Ala Wai Elementary School
Aliiolani Elementary School
Hokulani Elementary School
Jarrett Middle School
Jefferson Elementary School
Kuhio Elementary School
Lunalilo Elementary School
Palolo Elementary School
Washington Middle School

Feeder Middle Schools
Kaimuki High School feeds primarily from 3 middle schools in the Honolulu area.

William Paul Jarrett Middle School
President George Washington Middle School
 Kaimuki Middle School

Notable alumni

 Thelma Kalama Aiu (1931–1999) – swimming gold medalist at the 1948 Olympics 
 Mazie Hirono – U.S. Senator
 Brian Kolfage – veteran of the United States Air Force and the founder of the organization We Build the Wall
 Ruthie Ann Miles – actress
 Florence T. Nakakuni – United States Attorney for the District of Hawaii
 Franklin Odo – author, activist and historian
 Stan Sakai – artist
 Jake Shimabukuro – ukulele virtuoso
 Don Stroud – actor

Ohana O Mele
Among the notable organizations at Kaimuki High School is a musical group called Ohana O Mele. Ohana O Mele is the advanced Polynesian music class founded in 1977 by former teacher William Kaneda. After his retirement, Ohana O Mele remained inactive until being revitalized by then-current teacher Darryl Loo in 1996. Many well-known local musicians are alumni to this group, including Kapena, Ernie Cruz Jr., and John Feary.

After Darryl Loo's retirement, the Kaimuki alumnus Robert Yu took over as the Polynesian music instructor and renamed the group "Ka Ohana O Mele".

In the class students hone their musical skills on instruments including the ukulele, guitar, electric bass, and drums. Aside from cultivating musical skill, the students also learn a great deal about the aspects of performance. During the Christmas period, the group tours to perform for students in various elementary and intermediate schools. The group has also been invited to perform at the Academy of Arts and for the opening of the state legislature. In addition to playing gigs at the Honolulu International Airport, various hotels, and even retirement homes, Ohana O Mele puts on an annual concert at Kaimuki High School entitled “Kanikapila”.

References

External links
 

Public high schools in Honolulu
Educational institutions established in 1943
1943 establishments in Hawaii